Mount Kerckhove de Denterghem is a mountain,  high, just north of Mount Collard in the Belgica Mountains of Antarctica. It was discovered by the Belgian Antarctic Expedition, 1957–58, under G. de Gerlache, who named it for Count Charles de Kerchove de Denterghem, a patron of the expedition.

References

Mountains of Queen Maud Land
Prince Harald Coast